This is a list of German states by exports as of 2017 according to the Federal Statistical Office of Germany. 

The sum of the exports of the states is significantly lower than the value of Germany's exports. The difference results from goods originating from Federal States of origin, returned goods and goods with unidentified states of origin.

2017 list

References 

Exports
Exports
Exports
Exports
Germany,exports